Tretioscincus bifasciatus, the Rio Magdalena tegu, is a species of lizard in the family Gymnophthalmidae. It is found in Suriname, French Guiana, Venezuela, Margarita Island, Aruba, Curaçao, Bonaire, and Colombia.

References

Tretioscincus
Fauna of Aruba
Fauna of Bonaire
Reptiles of Colombia
Fauna of Curaçao
Reptiles of French Guiana
Reptiles of Suriname
Reptiles of Venezuela
Reptiles described in 1851
Taxa named by André Marie Constant Duméril